Giuseppe Favalli (born 8 January 1972) is an Italian former professional footballer. A versatile, consistent, tenacious and experienced defender, Favalli was capable of playing as a centre back as well as on the left or right flank as a full back.

After beginning his career with Cremonese in 1988, he played for Serie A clubs Lazio, Internazionale and Milan. At international level, Favalli represented the Italy national team on eight occasions between 1994 and 2004, and was a member of his nation's UEFA Euro 2004 squad. He was also a member of the under-23 side that took part at the 1992 Summer Olympics.

Club career

Cremonese
Favalli started his career with then-Serie B squad Cremonese in 1988. Following their promotion to Serie A in 1989 he made his top flight debut in a 2–1 defeat to Internazionale on 27 August 1989.

Lazio
Favalli's strong performance resulted in him being signed by Lazio during the summer of 1992. Following the departure of Alessandro Nesta to Milan in 2002, he became team captain. During his time with Lazio, he won one Scudetto, three Coppa Italia, two Supercoppa Italiana and the UEFA Super Cup, as well as establishing himself as a fan favourite. In 12 seasons with the Biancocelesti, he made 401 appearances in all competitions (becoming the player with second most appearances in Lazio's history), scoring six goals.

Inter
Favalli later moved to Internazionale joining the club on 1 June 2004 on a free transfer. With Inter, he won the Coppa Italia twice, in 2005 and 2006 meaning he had won the trophy in three consecutive years (2004, 2005 and 2006). He also won his second Scudetto with Inter following the Calciopoli scandal which saw Juventus stripped of the 2006 title and it being awarded to Inter. However, he was not always chosen to start for the team and the arrival of Fabio Grosso after the 2006 FIFA World Cup meant he was deemed surplus to the squad and as a result, did not have his contract renewed at the end of the 2006 season.

Milan
Favalli was then subsequently signed by Milan on a free transfer, as a replacement for his former Lazio teammate Giuseppe Pancaro, but once again, with players such as Kakha Kaladze and Paolo Maldini ahead of him in the ranks playing left-back, he would spend the seasons mainly on the bench. In the 2007 UEFA Champions League Final, he appeared as a substitute late in the match which saw Milan win their seventh European Cup/UEFA Champions League in a 2–1 win over Liverpool. He was affectionately nicknamed Favallinho by Milan supporters after he scored his only two goals of the 2006–07 Serie A campaign in back-to-back wins over Empoli and Messina in April 2007. Towards the end of his career, he was used as a centre-back by the Rossoneri.

On 1 July 2010, Favalii was released by Milan at age 38, then subsequently retired.

International career
Favalli has represented Italy at under-18 level, as well winning the 1992 UEFA European Under-21 Football Championship and playing at the 1992 Summer Olympics in Barcelona with the Italy under-21 side.

Favalli earned eight full caps for the Italian senior side between 1994 and 2004. He was part of the Italy squad that took part at UEFA Euro 2004; he made only one appearance throughout the tournament, replacing Gennaro Gattuso in the 76th minute of Italy's 1–1 draw with Sweden in the team's second group match. Italy performed below expectations and exited at the group stage on direct encounters, following a three-way five point tie with Sweden and Denmark; the later two sides qualified for the quarter-finals at their expense.

Career statistics

International
Source:

Honours

Club
Lazio
 Serie A: 1999–2000
 Coppa Italia: 1997–98, 1999–2000, 2003–04
 Supercoppa Italiana: 1998, 2000
 UEFA Cup Winners' Cup: 1998–99
 UEFA Super Cup: 1999

Internazionale
 Serie A: 2005–06
 Coppa Italia: 2004–05, 2005–06
 Supercoppa Italiana: 2005

A.C. Milan
 UEFA Champions League: 2006–07
 UEFA Super Cup: 2007
 FIFA Club World Cup: 2007

International
Italy
Under-21 European Championship: 1992

References

External links

 
 inter.it profile 
 National Team Statistics at FIGC official site 

1972 births
A.C. Milan players
Inter Milan players
Association football central defenders
Footballers at the 1992 Summer Olympics
Italian footballers
Italy international footballers
Living people
Olympic footballers of Italy
Sportspeople from the Province of Brescia
S.S. Lazio players
Serie A players
Serie B players
U.S. Cremonese players
UEFA Euro 2004 players
UEFA Champions League winning players
Footballers from Lombardy